The Roman Catholic Diocese of Tiraspol was a Latin Rite Roman Catholic diocese on Czarist/Soviet-controlled territory in and around what is now the republic of Moldova.

History 
It was established on 3 July 1848 as Diocese of Cherson, on Czarist territory split off from the Metropolitan Archdiocese of Mohilev, but was already renamed Tiraspol in 1952.

It lost territory in 1921 to the Romanian  Diocese of Iaşi, and again on 28 October 1993, to establish the Apostolic Administration of Moldova (now the diocese of Chisinau, covering the post-soviet republic of that name).

On 11 February 2002, it was suppressed, its territory being merged into the Russian Diocese of Saint Clement at Saratov.

Incumbent bishops 
''(incomplete?; all Roman Rite)
 Ferdinand Helanus Kahn, Dominican Order (O.P.) (1850.05.20 – death 1864.10)
 Auxiliary Bishop Wincenty Lipski (1856.09.18 – 1875.12.13)
 Franz Xaver von Zottman (1872.02.23 – 1889.12)
 Anton Johann Zerr (1889.12.30 – 1902.06.06), previously Titular Bishop of Diocletianopolis & Auxiliary Bishop of Tiraspol (1883.03.15 – 1889.12.30); later Titular Bishop of Salona (1925.11.23 – 1932.12.15)
 Eduard Baron von der Ropp (1902.06.09 – 1903.11.09); later Bishop of Vilnius (Lithuania) (1903.11.09 – 1917.07.25), then staying Apostolic Administrator of Vilnius a while (1917.07.25 – 1918.10.23) when promoted Metropolitan Archbishop of Mohilev (Belarus) (1917.07.25 – 1939.07.25)
 Josef Alois Kessler (1904.04.01 – 1930.01.23), later Titular Archbishop of Bosporus (1930.01.23 – 1933.12.09).

References

External links 
 GigaCatholic with incumbent biography links

Former Roman Catholic dioceses in Europe